Hur många kramar finns det i världen?

Plot 
Max (Per Morberg) is a successful New York-based advertisement photographer, but betrayal from his parents and girlfriend has made him bitter, mean and lonely. Just as he's about to commit suicide his phone rings. It is Peter (Claes Malmberg), Max's old childhood friend whom he hasn't spoken to in over 30 years. He wants Max to come to Sweden and help him film a YouTube-video of his daughter's intellectually disabled friends. Max accepts the offer and goes to Sweden, and from the start it looks like a pretty easy task, but it becomes more complicated than Max could ever imagine.

Cast 
 Per Morberg as Max
 Claes Malmberg as Peter
 Vanna Rosenberg as Hanna
 Mats Melin as Kjell-Åke
 Bosse Östlin as Ebbe
 Ellinore Holmer as Katarina
 Theresia Widarsson as Filippa
 Maja Karlsson as Kristina
 Figge Norling as Jocke
 Nisti Stêrk as a doctor
 Cornelia Ravenal as Dolores
 Scott Ackerman as Nicholas
 Max Altin as a model

Production 
This movie was produced by Peter Kropenin and Peter Possne, directed by Lena Koppel and written by Santiago Gil and Lena Koppel.

It was filmed in Hudiksvall and in New York during the fall of 2012.

Critical response 
This movie received mostly negative reviews. The Göteborgs-Posten said the "cheesy background story that includes Per Morberg, Vanja Rosenberg and Claes Malmberg" was "on the verge of a total failure". The Svenska Dagbladet said the structure of the movie "resembles a square Swedish 1940s movie".

References

External links 
 

2013 comedy-drama films
2013 films
Films directed by Lena Koppel
Swedish comedy-drama films
2010s Swedish films
2010s Swedish-language films